Carmen Artero Kasperbauer  (born 1935) is a Guamanian nurse and politician. Kasperbauer is a former Republican senator in the Guam Legislature.

Early life
In 1935, Kasperbauer was born in Guam as a Chamorro. Kasperbauer's father was Antonio C. Artero (1905-1984). Kasperbauer's mother was Josefa T. Artero. In 1940, Kasperbauer lived in Agana, Guam. During the Japanese occupancy of Guam, Kasperbauer's parents were known for hiding George Tweed on their property in Guam for about 21 months. When she was aged nine, in July 1944, during the Battle of Guam which ended the Japanese occupation of Guam, her neighbour Juan Pangelinan was arrested and executed by Japanese soldiers for hosting an American fugitive. She has said "I threw away my rosary ... God must have forsaken us".

Career 
Kasperbauer is a retired registered nurse.

In November 1978, Kasperbauer won the election and became a Republican senator in the Guam Legislature. Kasperbauer served her first term in January 1979 in the 15th Guam Legislature. In November 1980, as an incumbent, Kasperbauer won the election and continued serving as a senator. Kasperbauer served her second term in January 1981 in the 16th Guam Legislature. In November 1982, as an incumbent, Kasperbauer lost the election with insufficient number of votes.

Filmography 
 2004 An Island Invaded, a documentary directed by Esther Figueroa, Jim Bannan.

Personal life 
Kasperbauer's husband is Larry Kasperbauer. Kasperbauer and her family live in Dededo, Guam.

References

External links 
 New chapel to serve Astumbo community at guampdn.com

1936 births
Chamorro people
Guamanian Republicans
Guamanian women in politics
Living people
Members of the Legislature of Guam
20th-century American politicians
20th-century American women politicians
American women nurses
21st-century American women
Guamanian nurses